John Richardson (1669–1747) was an Anglican priest in Ireland.

Richardson was born in County Tyrone and educated at Trinity College, Dublin. He held livings at Annagh, County Cavan and Belturbet; and was Dean of Kilmacduagh from 1731 until his death.

References

Alumni of Trinity College Dublin
Deans of Kilmacduagh
People from County Tyrone
17th-century Irish Anglican priests
18th-century Irish Anglican priests
1669 births
1747 deaths